The 2022 Sofia Twenty20 tournament was a Twenty20 International (T20I) cricket tournament which was held in Sofia, Bulgaria, in June 2022. This was the second edition of the Sofia Twenty20; the 2021 tournament was contested by four nations, but the 2022 edition took the form of a four-match bilateral series between Bulgaria and Serbia. The series was played at the National Sports Academy in Sofia. The series provided both teams with preparation for the 2022–23 ICC Men's T20 World Cup Europe Qualifier subregional tournaments.

Squads

T20I series

1st T20I

2nd T20I

3rd T20I

4th T20I

Notes

References

External links
 Series home at ESPN Cricinfo

Associate international cricket competitions in 2022